Gracilaria changii is an agarophytic red algae mostly found in mangroves. The nuclear and chloroplast genomes of G. changii have been sequenced.

References

Gracilariales